Robert Douglas "Doug" Partie (born October 21, 1961 in Santa Barbara, California) is a former American volleyball player, who was a member of the United States men's national volleyball team that won the gold medal at the 1988 Summer Olympics in Seoul, South Korea. Four years later in Barcelona, Spain he claimed the bronze medal with the men's national team.  He was a middle blocker.

References
 
 USA Olympic Team
 

1961 births
Living people
American men's volleyball players
Volleyball players at the 1988 Summer Olympics
Volleyball players at the 1992 Summer Olympics
Olympic gold medalists for the United States in volleyball
Olympic bronze medalists for the United States in volleyball
Place of birth missing (living people)
Medalists at the 1988 Summer Olympics
Medalists at the 1992 Summer Olympics
Goodwill Games medalists in volleyball
Competitors at the 1986 Goodwill Games
UCLA Bruins men's volleyball players
Pan American Games medalists in volleyball
Pan American Games gold medalists for the United States
Medalists at the 1987 Pan American Games